Utah State Route 40 may refer to:

 Utah State Route 40,  the state highway designation (legislative overlay) for U.S. Route 40 within Utah, United States, that runs from Interstate 80/U.S. Route 189 at Silver Creek Junction (in Summit County) to the Colorado state line, northwest of Dinosaur, Colorado, (through Summit, Wasatch, Duchesne, and Uintah counties)
 By Utah State law, U.S. Route 40 within the state has been defined as "State Route 40" since 1977
 Utah State Route 40 (1933-1977), a former state in western Weber County, Utah, United States, that connected Utah State Route 37 in Kanesville with North Ogden, by way of Plain City (Utah State Route 40 was renumbered Utah State Route 134 in 1977)

See also

 List of state highways in Utah
 List of U.S. Highways in Utah
 List of named highway junctions in Utah
 List of highways numbered 40

External links

 Utah Department of Transportation Highway Resolutions: Route 40 (PDF)